The UK Rock & Metal Singles Chart is a record chart which ranks the best-selling rock and heavy metal songs in the United Kingdom. Compiled and published by the Official Charts Company, the data is based on each track's weekly physical sales, digital downloads and streams. In 2011, there were 20 singles that topped the 52 published charts. The first number-one single of the year was 1986's "Livin' On a Prayer" by Bon Jovi. "Christmas Time (Don't Let the Bells End)" was also the final number-one single of the year, topping the final chart of the year published on Christmas Day.

The most successful song on the UK Rock & Metal Singles Chart in 2011 was "Iris" by Goo Goo Dolls, which spent ten weeks at number one across three different spells. "Bring Me to Life" by Evanescence was number one for five weeks in 2011, while the band also topped the chart with "My Immortal" (two weeks) and "What You Want" (one week). Muse spent seven weeks at number one with "Feeling Good", as did Foo Fighters with "Walk" (three weeks), "Best of You" and "Arlandria" (two weeks each). My Chemical Romance were number one for five weeks in 2011, four of which were with "Sing". "Sweet Child o' Mine" by Guns N' Roses was also number one for four weeks, while Nickelback's "When We Stand Together" was number one for three.

Chart history

See also
2011 in British music
List of UK Rock & Metal Albums Chart number ones of 2011

References

External links
Official UK Rock & Metal Singles Chart Top 40 at the Official Charts Company
The Official UK Top 40 Rock Singles at BBC Radio 1

2011 in British music
United Kingdom Rock and Metal Singles
2011